The Machilipatnam–Dharmavaram Express is an Express train belonging to South Central Railway zone that runs between  and  in India. It is currently being operated with 17215/17216 train numbers on a daily basis.

Previously it ends at Vijayawada.It had been extended upto Machilipatnam from 14th February 2023
Also this is the first passenger train to bypass  by halting at newly built  thus saving engine reversing time and efforts.

Service

The 17215/Machilipatnam–Dharmavaram Express has an average speed of 45 km/hr and covers 695 km in 14h 10m. The 17216/Dharmavaram–Machilipatnam Express has an average speed of 44.8 km/hr and covers 695 km in 15h 10m.

Route and halts 

The important halts of the train are:
 
 
 
 
 
 
Markapur Road
Giddalur

Banaganapalle
Koilakuntla
 
 
 
Tadipatri

Coach composition

The train has standard LHB rakes with a max speed of 130 kmph. The train consists of 16 coaches:

 1 AC II Tier
 3 AC III Tier
 7 Sleeper coaches
 3 General Coaches 
 2 Generators cum Luggage/parcel van

Traction

Both trains are hauled by a Vijayawada Loco Shed-based WAP-4 or WAP-7 electric locomotive from Machilipatnam to Dharmavaram, and vice versa.

Direction reversal

The train reverses its direction 1 time:

See also 

 Dharmavaram Junction railway station
 Vijayawada Junction railway station

Notes 
Frequency of this train has been increased. Now it runs as daily train effective February 2019.

References 

5. https://www.thehindu.com/news/national/andhra-pradesh/union-minister-kishan-reddy-flags-off-dharmavaram-machilipatnam-express-in-andhra-pradesh/article66509002.ece

External links 

 17215/Vijayawada - Dharmavaram Express India Rail Info
 17216/Dharmavaram - Vijayawada Express India Rail Info

Transport in Vijayawada
Express trains in India
Rail transport in Andhra Pradesh
Railway services introduced in 2016